Kevin De Freitas is a Canadian music video and commercial director.

Career

He directed the Canadian series of PSAs for Bono’s Make Poverty History ‘Click’ campaign, which was part of the Live 8 concert event for Africa.

NorthBay Media Arts commissioned Kevin De Freitas to direct their script "Toobie", a coming of age story about bullying. The 45min Short Feature Film premiered at the Maryland International Film Festival. Over 10,000 middle school students per year watch the film, from Philadelphia to Washington, D. C., to spark conversations about bullying, the power of education, and the ripple effect of making positive decisions.

Awards and recognition

At the 2008 MuchMusic Video Awards, he won Best Director and Best Video of the Year for
Hedley's "For the Nights I Can't Remember". He also won Best Rock Video and Best Cinematography for Hedley's "She's So Sorry". In 2007, he was awarded Best Pop Video for Hedley's "Gunnin". In 2003, he won a Best Pop MMVA for Shawn Desman's "Get Ready". The Reel World Film Festival presented De Freitas with a Trailblazer Award for Achievement in Filmmaking in 2002. In 2001, he won a Best Rap Video MMVA for Baby Blue Soundcrew's "Money Jane" (featuring Sean Paul, Kardinal Offishall and Jully Black).

Personal life

He currently lives in Los Angeles, CA.

References

Canadian music video directors
Living people
Year of birth missing (living people)